Valley View Middle School may refer to:
Valley View Middle School (Edina, Minnesota)
Valley View Middle School (Simi Valley, California)
Valley View Middle School (Pleasant Hill, California)
Valley View Middle School (Bloomington, Minnesota)
Valley View Middle School (Germantown, Ohio)
Valley View Middle School (El Paso, Texas)
Valley View Middle School (Snohomish, Washington)
Valley View Middle School (Archbald, Pennsylvania)
Valley View Middle School (Watchung, New Jersey)